Liu Sa (born July 11, 1987 in Beijing) is a Chinese football player who competed for the national team in the 2008 Summer Olympics. Her position is that of striker.

International goals

Major performances
2004 U19 World Cup - 2nd
2005 National Games - 1st
2007 World Cup - Quarterfinals
2008 Asian Cup - 2nd

References
http://2008teamchina.olympic.cn/index.php/personview/personsen/1745
https://web.archive.org/web/20080811005113/http://results.beijing2008.cn/WRM/ENG/BIO/Athlete/5/236635.shtml

1987 births
Living people
Chinese women's footballers
Footballers at the 2008 Summer Olympics
Olympic footballers of China
Footballers from Beijing
China women's international footballers
Women's association football forwards
2007 FIFA Women's World Cup players